Prödel is a former municipality in the Jerichower Land district, in Saxony-Anhalt, Germany. Since 1 January 2008, it is part of the town Gommern.

Former municipalities in Saxony-Anhalt
Jerichower Land